Tour Terral is the second live album by Spanish singer-songwriter Pablo Alborán.

At the 17th Annual Latin Grammy Awards, the album received two nominations; Album of the Year and Best Contemporary Pop Vocal Album.

Track listing 
Disc 1
 "Está Permitido"	
 "La Escalera"	
 "Pasos de cero"	
 "Ecos"	
 "Recuérdame"	
 "Quimera"	
 "Un Buen Amor"
 "Desencuentro"
 "Cuando Te Alejas" (with Jorge Drexler)
 "El Olvido"
 "Miedo"	
 "El Beso"
 "Perdóname" (with Carminho)	
 "Te He Echado de Menos"	
 "Ahogándome Tu Adiós"

Disc two
 "Caramelo"
 "Quién" (with Alejandro Sanz)
 "Gracias"
 "Dónde está el Amor"	
 "Tanto"
 "Extasis"	
 "Volver a Empezar"
 "Solamente Tú"
 "En Casa Del Herrero"	
 "Por Fin"	
 "Despidete"
 "Vívela"

DVD 
 "Está Permitido"	
 "La Escalera"	
 "Pasos De Cero"	
 "Ecos"	
 "Recuérdame"	
 "Quimera	
 "Un Buen Amor"	
 "Desencuentro"	
 "Cuando Te Alejas" (with Jorge Drexler)	
 "El Olvido"	
 "Miedo"	
 "El Beso"	
 "Perdóname" (with Carminho)	
 "Te He Echado De Menos"	
 "Ahogándome Tu Adiós"	
 "Caramelo"	
 "Quién" (with Alejandro Sanz)	
 "Gracias"	
 "Dónde Está El Amor"	
 "Tanto"	
 "Éxtasis"	
 "Volver a Empezar"	
 "Solamente Tú"	
 "En Casa Del Herrero"	
 "Por Fin" (with Bebe)	
 "Despidete"	
 "Vivela"
 "El Viaje Del Viento" (documentary)

Charts

Weekly charts

Year-end charts

Certifications

References

2015 live albums
Pablo Alborán live albums
Spanish-language live albums